Kingston is a small settlement on the Isle of Wight, United Kingdom, located five miles southwest of Newport in the southwest of the island, an area known as the Back of the Wight. It is in the civil parish of Shorwell.

Formerly a separate Anglican parish, with its own parish church, St. James' Church, Kingston is now amalgamated with the adjacent Anglican parish of Shorwell, as Shorwell with Kingston.

References

Villages on the Isle of Wight
Former civil parishes in the Isle of Wight